Fazl Ali-bey Javanshir (b. ?, Safavid Karabakh - d. 1738, Afsharid Empire) was a member of the Karabakh Javanshir tribe, the elder brother of Panahali Khan Javanshir. He worked as viceroy (naib) and chief butler (Eshik-agasybashi) of Nadir Shah Afshar.

Life 
After ending the Safavid rule, Nadir Shah Afshar abolished the beylarbeys of Shirvan, Karabakh, Chukhursad and Tabriz and unified Azerbaijan into a single administrative division with Tabriz as its capital and his brother Ibrahim Khan as its head. Nadir Shah recruited Fazlali Bey and Panahali Bey (later Panahali Khan), the sons of Ibrahimkhalil Agha, from the Javanshir clan to serve in his army. Because of their bravery, Nadir Shah appointed Fazlali Bey first as a viceroy and then as a butler. After Fazlali Bey was killed because he openly protested to Nadir Shah regarding the exile of the Karabakh lands, his position was entrusted to his younger brother Panahali Bey. According to Mirza Adigozal bey, Nadir Shah wanted to replace murdered Fazl Ali-bey Javanshir with his younger brother Panahali khan, “handed him the chomak (staff), clad him in the clothes of an eshik-agasy, and conferred on him the rights of his dead elder brother;” Mirza Adigozal bey wrote that Panah Ali bey found it humiliated to “carry the chomak, bow to Nadir Shah, and talk to his osauls.” Because his brother Fazl Ali bey was killed by Nader Shah, so he went off to plunder wealth with his tribesmen and went into hiding.

See also
Ibrahim Khalil Khan
Javanshir Qizilbash
Qizilbashi
 Amir Khan Yaghlevandli-Javanshir

References

Source 
 

 

1738 deaths
Karabakh Khanate
18th century in Azerbaijan
17th-century people of Safavid Iran
People from Afsharid Iran
18th-century people of Safavid Iran
Ethnic Afshar people